Ynav Boseeba is a 1968 Khmer film adapted from one of the many tales of 1001 Arabian Nights. The film is directed by Yvon Hem and stars Kong Som Eun and Saom Vansodany. The film was discovered to be in existence in 2009.

Cast 
Kong Som Eun
Saom Vansodany

Soundtrack 
Snae Enov Bosseba by Sinn Si Samouth and Pen Ron
Thomnougnh Bosseba by Ros Serey Sothea

References 

1968 films
Khmer-language films
Cambodian drama films